Brgat is a set of villages called Brgat Donji (lower Brgat) and Brgat Gornji (upper Brgat), located in Croatia, on the border with Trebinje, Bosnia and Herzegovina. The D223 highway passes through Brgat Gornji.

References

Populated places in Dubrovnik-Neretva County